Bluetree was a Northern Irish contemporary Christian band. The band is best known for its song "God of This City", which received international exposure when it was covered by Chris Tomlin on the Passion: God of This City and Hello Love albums. As an independent artist, Bluetree signed distribution agreements with Lucid Entertainment in the US and Kingsway in the UK & Europe for their album, God of this City.

History
Bluetree originated in Belfast's Christian Fellowship Church (CFC) in 2004. Bluetree originally consisted of five members, with Pete Kernoghan joining later. While the band was travelling on a missions trip to Pattaya, Thailand, the poor conditions of the city became the inspiration for their song, "God of this City". Band members report the song came from divine inspiration when the band was playing in a bar.  As an independent band, they recorded their debut album, Greater Things, at the Windmill Lane Studios (U2's preferred studio). The record was initially released in September 2007, but on 24 January 2008, their album was picked up by Fierce! Records for UK Distribution. In May 2009 the band launched their charity "Stand Out International", a charity that indirectly rescues kids out of the sex industry, and also had their first album released in North America as "God of This City".  In 2013, the charity was relaunched in the US under the name Bluetree Worship, a US 501(c)(3) non-profit.

Bluetree have a Dove Award nomination from 2009 for "God of This City".

Bluetree's second studio album Kingdom began production in Liverpool's Parr Street Studios in April 2011, and was digitally released on 8 May 2012 with a small-scale US CD release in June.

In 2013, two live projects were released. The first was recorded in 2010 between their first two studio albums, with all funds raised going toward their mission and justice work trip to Cambodia with Ratanak in November 2013. The second was recorded at the Super Summer camp in June 2013 and features guest and fellow Northern Irishman, Nathan Jess.

2014 will see the release of Bluetree's first material with Integrity Media, having recently signed publishing and recording contracts. The first album under the contract was recorded in May 2014 with production by Michael Rossback and release due late summer.  Bluetree's lead singer and founder, Aaron Boyd, regularly leads worship at his home church CFC in Belfast. Bluetree has toured with American Christian rock band 2nd Mile.

In September 2017, Aaron Boyd discontinued the Bluetree moniker, and continues to tour as a solo artist.

Members
 Aaron Boyd – lead vocals, acoustic guitar, songwriter
 Peter Nickell – bass, keys & tracks
 Peter Burton – electric guitar
 Matt Weir – drums
 Pete Morrison - electric guitar
 Jonny Hobson — drums
 Pete Kernoghan – DJ, loops
 Peter Comfort – drums
 Connor McCrory – electric guitar
 Stephen Greer – electric guitar
 Richard Blakely – electric guitar
 Ian Jordan – keys 
 Andy McCann – bass

Discography

Awards and accolades
 "Break out Artist of the Year" 2009 Worship Leader Magazine Readers Choice Awards USA
 "Song of the Year" 2009 Worship Leader Magazine Readers Choice awards USA
  Nominated as Best New Artist - GMA Dove Awards 2010
 Greater Things - Cross Rhythms' 20 Best Albums of 2007
"God of this City" - Cross Rhythms' 20 Best Songs of 2007
 A musical named after their hit song 'God Of This City' won a Dove Award for Youth/Children's Musical of the year at the 43rd annual GMA Dove Awards.

References

External links
 
 The story behind the song "God of this City" (video)
 God of This City review at ExperiencingWorship.com

Musical groups from Belfast
British Christian rock groups
Rock music groups from Northern Ireland